Wallinger is a surname which may refer to:

Sir Geoffrey Wallinger (1903–1979), British ambassador
Sir John Wallinger (1869–1931), British intelligence officer
Karl Wallinger (born 1957),  Welsh musician, songwriter and record producer
Mark Wallinger (born 1959), British artist
Noel Wallinger (1865–1948), English-born miner, civil servant and political figure in British Columbia, Canada